Ilopango is a town in the San Salvador department of El Salvador. It is a few miles east of the nation's capital, San Salvador. It is located near Lake Ilopango, the country's largest lake at 72 square kilometers.

Overview

El Salvador's second airport is in Ilopango. It is currently used for charter flights and by the Salvadoran military but plans are underway to increase its use as tourism and travel in El Salvador increase and Comalapa International Airport cannot handle the future influx alone. The Civil Aviation Authority has its headquarters on the airport property, in Ilopango.

References

External links

Municipalities of the San Salvador Department